Type C3-class ships were the third type of cargo ship designed by the United States Maritime Commission (MARCOM) in the late 1930s. As it had done with the Type C1 ships and Type C2 ships, MARCOM circulated preliminary plans for comment. The design presented was not specific to any service or trade route, but was a general purpose ship that could be modified for specific uses. A total of 162 C3 ships were built from 1939 to 1946.

Like the C2, it had five cargo holds. A total of 465 of these ships were built between 1940 and 1947. A total of 75 ships were built with C3 hulls and engines, but not built as cargo ships.

Ships in type
C3 DWT 12,595 as in 
C3-A  DWT 10,000 as in 
C3-E DWT 9,514 as in 
C3-P&C DWT 10,000 some converted to 
C3-S-A1 DWT 12,595 as in  some converted to 
C3-S-A2 DWT 12,595 as in 
C3-S1-A3 DWT 12,595 as in 
C3-S-A4 DWT 11,000  the six President ships
C3-S-A5 DWT 11,800 as in 
C3-S1-BR1 DWT 9,900, three built: Del Norte, Del Sud & Del Mar
C3-S-BH1 DWT 12,600 five built: Tillie Lykes, Almeria Lykes, Lipscomb Lykes, Norman Lykes & Doctor Lykes
C3 Mod. DWT 12,430, as in 
C3 conversion: Two Sun Ship C3 ships were converted to s.

Production

 Ingalls Shipbuilding, MS: 80
 Seattle-Tacoma Shipbuilding Corporation, WA: 43
 Western Pipe and Steel Company, CA: 43
 Bethlehem Sparrows Point Shipyard, MD: 21
 Federal Shipbuilding and Drydock Company, NJ: 19
 Newport News Shipbuilding, VA: 10
 Bethlehem Fore River, MA: 8
 Sun Shipbuilding & Drydock Co., PA: 8
 Moore Dry Dock Company, CA: 4
 Tampa Shipbuilding Company, FL: 2

Modified and redesignated

 45 s
 59 Attack transports
 3 
 4 
 2 
 9 
 34 
 7 
 7 Submarine tenders
 
 2 
 4 
 2 s
 AR-9 (prev: AK-29), AR-12
 2 s
 ,

Notable incidents

  a C3-E, was torpedoed and sank off the coast of Madagascar on 30 June 1942.
  a C3, renamed Empire Condor was torpedoed and sank off coast of Tunisia on 13 August 1942.
 Rio Hudson a C3-P&C, rebuilt and converted to Avenger-class escort carrier. Was renamed  was torpedoed and sank near Gibraltar on 15 November 1942.
  USN CVE-21, a C3-S-A1, was torpedoed and sank near the Azores-Canary Islands on 29 May 1944.
 Rio de Janeiro a C3-P&C, Avenger-class escort carrier, renamed , exploded and sank in the Lower Clyde in Scotland in 1943.
 The Attack on USNS Card on 2 May 1964, while moored dockside in Saigon, a North Vietnamese frogman, Lam Son Nao, planted an explosive charge that blew a hole in the hull, killing five crewmen.

See also
 Type C4 ship
 T2 tanker
 Liberty ship
 Victory ship
 Hog Islander
 U.S. Merchant Marine Academy

References

 
 

Ship types
Auxiliary ship classes of the United States Navy
Type C3-P&C ships
Type C3-E ships
Type C3-S-A1 ships of the Royal Navy